Zabzugu Senior High School is a community day school located in Tuvugu in the Zabzugu district in the Northern region of Ghana.

History 
The school was established on 28 January 1991 and had 83 students. The first headmaster of the school was Mr. Abdulai Mohammed. In 2020, Zabzugu SHS won the first contest for the Northern zone in the National Science and Maths Quiz against Anbariya Senior High School and Gowrie Senior High Technical School.

References 

High schools in Ghana
Education in Ghana
1991 establishments in Ghana